Grey Friars F.C. was an English association football club based in London.

History
The club was founded in 1877.  The club's first match, against Woodgrange, included seven players who had played for Saxons F.C. the previous season, including R. Rutherford, who was the club's first secretary.  The club played 21 matches in its first season, all against London clubs, winning 16 and losing one.  

The club did not enter the FA Cup in this first season, but did so for the next three seasons; in 1879-80 the club reached the fourth round (which, that year, was made up of the last ten clubs), losing 1-0 to the Royal Engineers.  The club captain for that year, E.D. Ellis, was an umpire in the semi-finals, nominated by the Old Etonians.  In 1880-81 the club reached the same stage, this time a final 12, but lost the Old Etonians.

Despite a strong showing, the club ceased playing before the 1881-82 season.  The last reference to the club is to one of its members acting as umpire in an FA Cup tie the following year.  The club's players either left the game or joined other clubs; two played for Upton Park in 1881-82, one played for St Bartholomew's Hospital, two played for Hendon, and two for Mosquitoes.

Ground

The club played at the following home grounds:

Colours
The club wore cerise and French grey halves.

Notable players
T.G. Stafford, who played in a trial match to determine the England side to face Scotland in the 1879 international.

References

Defunct football clubs in England
Defunct football clubs in London
Association football clubs established in 1877
Association football clubs disestablished in 1881